Aldine Calacurcio (June 8, 1928 – July 4, 2017) was a former shortstop who played in the All-American Girls Professional Baseball League. Calacurcio batted and threw right handed. She was born in Rockford, Illinois.

In 1947, Calacurcio attended the AAGPBL spring training games held at Havana, Cuba. Afterwards, she saw limited action with her hometown Rockford Peaches.

The AAGPBL folded in 1954, but there is a permanent display at the Baseball Hall of Fame and Museum at Cooperstown, New York since November 5, 1988, that honors the entire league rather than any individual figure.

Calacurcio died on July 4, 2017 in Rockford IL. Her funeral was attended by numerous Rockfordians who respected her and the legacy of the Rockford Peaches.

Sources

1928 births
2017 deaths
All-American Girls Professional Baseball League players
Rockford Peaches players
Baseball players from Illinois
Sportspeople from Rockford, Illinois
21st-century American women